Goshamahal Assembly constituency is a constituency of Telangana Legislative Assembly, India. It is one of 15 constituencies in Capital city of Hyderabad. It is part of Hyderabad Lok Sabha constituency.     

Raja Singh (now Independent after 23 August 2022) from Bharatiy Janata party is representing the constituency. He was elected for the first time in 2014 and re-elected for second term in 2018. The constituency before 2008 was Maharaj Ganj and its legislator was Prem Singh Rathore from BJP (now TRS).

Extent of the constituency
The constituency was created before the 2009 elections as per Delimitation Act of 2002.

The Assembly Constituency presently comprises the following neighbourhoods:

Members of Legislative Assembly

Election results

Telangana Legislative Assembly election, 2018

Telangana Legislative Assembly election, 2014

Andhra Pradesh Legislative Assembly election, 2009

Trivia
 Goshamahal is the only assembly seat in Hyderabad Lok Sabha constituency, which has never been won by AIMIM. Prem Singh Rathore got elected as BJP MLA from Maharajganj in 1999, later where he resigned as a form of protest. He is the only BJP legislator who got a large amount of support from Muslim dominated areas.

See also
 List of constituencies of Telangana Legislative Assembly

References

Assembly constituencies of Telangana